

England

Head Coach: Clive Woodward

 Adedayo Adebayo
 Garath Archer
 Neil Back
 Scott Benton
 Kyran Bracken
 Mike Catt
 Richard Cockerill
 Lawrence Dallaglio (c.)
 Matt Dawson
 Phil de Glanville
 Tony Diprose
 Darren Garforth
 Paul Grayson
 Will Greenwood
 Danny Grewcock
 Jeremy Guscott
 Austin Healey
 Richard Hill
 Martin Johnson
 Jason Leonard
 Matt Perry
 David Rees
 Mark Regan
 Graham Rowntree
 Dean Ryan
 Phil Vickery
 Dorian West
 Jonny Wilkinson

France

Head Coach: Jean-Claude Skrela

 David Aucagne
 Jean-Marc Aue
 Philippe Benetton
 Philippe Bernat-Salles
 Olivier Brouzet
 Christian Califano
 Philippe Carbonneau
 Thomas Castaignède
 Thierry Cleda
 Marc Dal Maso
 Christophe Dominici
 Richard Dourthe
 Fabien Galthié
 Xavier Garbajosa
 Stéphane Glas
 Raphaël Ibañez (c.)
 Christophe Lamaison
 Marc Lièvremont
 Thomas Lièvremont
 Olivier Magne
 Fabien Pelous
 Jean-Luc Sadourny
 Cédric Soulette
 Franck Tournaire

Ireland

Head Coach: Brian Ashton (resigned)/Warren Gatland

 Allen Clarke
 Ciaran Clarke
 Peter Clohessy
 David Corkery
 Reggie Corrigan
 Victor Costello
 Kieron Dawson
 Eric Elwood
 Gabriel Fulcher
 Mick Galwey
 Rob Henderson
 Denis Hickie
 David Humphreys
 Paddy Johns
 Killian Keane
 Kevin Maggs
 Mark McCall
 Conor McGuinness
 Stephen McIvor
 Eric Miller
 Ross Nesdale
 Malcolm O'Kelly
 Brian O'Meara
 Conor O'Shea
 Nick Popplewell
 Paul Wallace
 Richard Wallace
 Andy Ward
 Keith Wood (c.)

Scotland

Head Coach: Jim Telfer

 Gary Armstrong (c.)
 Gordon Bulloch
 Paul Burnell
 Craig Chalmers
 Damian Cronin
 Graham Ellis
 Hugh Gilmour
 George Graham
 Stuart Grimes
 David Hilton
 Simon Holmes
 Craig Joiner
 Derrick Lee
 Kenny Logan
 Shaun Longstaff
 Cameron Murray
 Andy Nicol
 Eric Peters
 Budge Pountney
 Adam Roxburgh
 Rowen Shepherd
 Ian Smith
 Tony Stanger
 Mattie Stewart
 Alan Tait
 Gregor Townsend
 Rob Wainwright
 Peter Walton
 Doddie Weir
 Peter Wright

Wales

Head Coach: Kevin Bowring

 Rob Appleyard
 Allan Bateman
 Neil Boobyer
 Colin Charvis
 Leigh Davies
 Stuart Davies
 Scott Gibbs
 Byron Hayward
 Rob Howley (c.)
 Jonathan Humphreys
 Dafydd James
 Garin Jenkins
 Neil Jenkins
 Paul John
 Kingsley Jones
 Andrew Lewis
 Gareth Llewellyn
 Andy Moore
 Kevin Morgan
 Lyndon Mustoe
 Wayne Proctor
 Scott Quinnell
 Stuart Roy
 Chris Stephens
 Arwel Thomas
 Gareth Thomas
 Mike Voyle
 Nigel Walker
 Barry Williams
 Martyn Williams
 David Young

External links

Six Nations Championship squads